A tetraneutron is a hypothetical stable cluster of four neutrons. The existence of this cluster of particles is not supported by current models of nuclear forces. There is some empirical evidence suggesting that this particle does exist, based on a 2001 experiment by Francisco-Miguel Marqués and co-workers at the Ganil accelerator in Caen using a novel detection method in observations of the disintegration of beryllium and lithium nuclei. However, subsequent attempts to replicate this observation have failed.

Further work in 2019 suggests potentially observable consequences in neutron star crusts, if the tetraneutron exists.

As detailed at the end of this article, subsequent observations from different ion beam experiments are consistent with short-lived four neutron states with some binding.

Marqués' experiment 
As with many particle accelerator experiments, Marques' team fired atomic nuclei at carbon targets and observed the "spray" of particles from the resulting collisions. In this case the experiment involved firing beryllium-14, boron-15 and lithium-11 nuclei at a small carbon target, the most successful being beryllium-14. This isotope of beryllium has a nuclear halo that consists of four clustered neutrons; this allows it to be easily separated intact in the high-speed collision with the carbon target. Current nuclear models suggest that four separate neutrons should result when beryllium-10 is produced, but the single signal detected in the production of beryllium-10 suggested a multineutron cluster in the breakup products; most likely a beryllium-10 nucleus and four neutrons fused together into a tetraneutron.

Since Marqués' experiment 
A later analysis of the method used in the Marqués' experiment suggested that the detection mechanism was unlikely but the suggestion was refuted, and attempts to reproduce these observations with different methods have not successfully detected any neutron clusters. If, however, the existence of stable tetraneutrons were ever independently confirmed, considerable adjustments would have to be made to current nuclear models.  Bertulani and Zelevinsky proposed that, if it existed, the tetraneutron could be formed by a bound state of two dineutron systems. However, attempts to model interactions that might give rise to multineutron clusters have failed, and it "does not seem possible to change modern nuclear Hamiltonians to bind a tetraneutron without destroying many other successful predictions of those Hamiltonians. This means that, should a recent experimental claim of a bound tetraneutron be confirmed, our understanding of nuclear forces will have to be significantly changed."

In 2016 researchers at RIKEN in Wakō, Japan observed evidence that the tetraneutron exists briefly as a resonance. They fired a beam of neutron-rich helium-8 nuclei (two protons and six neutrons) at a liquid target composed of helium-4 (two protons and two neutrons). Occasionally, the reaction produced beryllium-8 nuclei with four protons and four neutrons, leaving four neutrons unaccounted for.  If a four-neutron nucleus did occur, it lasted for about 10−21 seconds before decaying into other particles. 

In 2021, on the other hand, a team at the Technical University of Munich bombarded a lithium-7 target with lithium-7 and found preliminary evidence of a bound state of four neutrons, with an estimated lifetime of several minutes, similar to that of a free neutron.

A 2022 experiment, again at RIKEN, sent a helium-8 beam into a proton-rich target, prompting the ejection of an α-particle in the opposite direction, and leaving four neutrons in the moving frame.

See also 
 Neutronium
 Tetraquark

Notes

External links 
 Announcement of possible tetraneutron observations
 Announcement of possible tetraneutron observations 
 Announcement of possible tetraneutron observations (Internet Archive)

Hypothetical nuclei
Neutron
Neutronium-4